Bakhtior Kalandarov (born 14 June 1992) is a Tajik professional footballer who plays as a defender for Ravshan Kulob in the Tajik League.

Career

Club 
On 25 July 2019, FC Istiklol released Kalandarov by mutual consent.

Aizawl 
On 23 February 2022, Kalandarov made his move to India and signed with I-League club Aizawl on a season-long deal.

He made his debut for the club, on 8 March 2022, against Rajasthan United, which ended in a 1–0 defeat.

International 
Kalandarov made his senior team debut on 2 October 2018 against Nepal in their 2–0 win.

Career statistics

Club

International

Honours 
Istiklol
Tajik Supercup: 2019

References

External links 
 
 

1992 births
Living people
Tajikistani footballers
Tajikistan international footballers
Association football defenders
Tajikistani expatriate sportspeople in India
Tajikistani expatriate footballers
Expatriate footballers in India
Aizawl FC players
I-League players